Lochmaeocles laticinctus is a species of beetle in the family Cerambycidae. It was described by Dillon and Dillon in 1946. It is known from Guatemala.

References

laticinctus
Beetles described in 1946